William Lindsay Osteen (July 15, 1930 – August 9, 2009) was a United States district judge of the United States District Court for the Middle District of North Carolina.

Education and career
Osteen was born in Greensboro, North Carolina and graduated from Guilford High School. After high school, he joined the United States Army Reserve in 1948 and served for two years leaving in 1951. He received an Artium Baccalaureus degree from Guilford College in 1953. He received a Bachelor of Laws from the University of North Carolina School of Law in 1956.

He was in private practice of law in North Wilkesboro, North Carolina from 1956 to 1958 and in Greensboro, North Carolina from 1958 to 1969. He was the United States Attorney for the Middle District of North Carolina from 1969 to 1974. He was in private practice of law in Greensboro from 1974 to 1991.

Federal judicial service
Osteen was nominated by President George H. W. Bush on April 25, 1991, to the United States District Court for the Middle District of North Carolina, to a new seat created by 104 Stat. 5089. He was confirmed by the United States Senate on June 14, 1991, and received his commission on June 18, 1991. Osteen assumed senior status on April 3, 2006 and retired on September 14, 2007. He was succeeded by his son, William Lindsay Osteen Jr.

He is buried at Forest Lawn Cemetery, Greensboro North Carolina.

References

Sources
FJC Bio

1930 births
2009 deaths
Guilford College alumni
University of North Carolina School of Law alumni
Judges of the United States District Court for the Middle District of North Carolina
United States district court judges appointed by George H. W. Bush
20th-century American judges
United States Attorneys for the Middle District of North Carolina
United States Army soldiers
United States Army reservists